Jabardasth is an Indian Telugu-language sketch comedy television show produced by Mallemala Entertainments. It was conceived and directed by Sanjeev K Kumar, and later directed by Sanjeev's associates Nithin and Bharat. It was premiered on ETV on 7 February 2013.

The show is hosted by Anasuya Bharadwaj. Initially judged by actor Nagendra Babu and actress Roja, Babu left the show in 2019 with singer Mano replacing him. Jani and Sekhar have also appeared in the show as guest judges.

The show is popular among the Telugu audience, but it is criticized for its obscene and problematic content. An extended version of the show, Extra Jabardasth began airing in 2014.

Concept 
The concept of Jabardasth and Extra Jabardasth is, where six teams participates makes a comedy skit performance, generally sitcom which are judged by singer Mano and actress Roja to marks 10/10 by each, where the winner(s) gets cheque prize of INRs 25,000  and a poster of the week will be decided based on the skit performed by winners.

Teams

Series overview 

Jabardasth show has been aired with three series.

Series 1 (2013) 
Series 1 aired from 7 February 2013 to 15 August 2013. Six teams competed.

Series 2 (2013–2014) 
Series 2 aired from 22 August 2013 to 10 October 2014.

Series 3 (2014) 
Series 3 debuted 17 October 2014.

Current Series

Controversies 

 In December 2014, a police case has been registered against Venu Wonders team leader, Venu for allegedly insulting the working class women's lifestyle in a skit. He was also physically attacked while the controversy was going on. Venu got support on social media from a few celebrities and commoners, who criticised the attack. A case has also been registered against some people who are believed to have attacked Venu during the issue.
 The Jabardasth episode that aired 30 October 2014 featured scenes of Brahmin characters drinking alcohol. Kethireddy Anjireddy of Thimmappur has filed a case in the court and the court has directed to register a case against the actors and judges involved in the comedy.

References 

Indian comedy television series
2010s comedy television series
2013 Indian television series debuts
Telugu-language television shows
ETV Telugu original programming
Variety television series